Francisco Juan Martínez Mojica (born 5 October 1963) is a Spanish molecular biologist and microbiologist at the University of Alicante in Spain. He is known for his discovery of repetitive, functional DNA sequences in bacteria which he named CRISPR (Clustered Regularly Interspaced Short Palindromic Repeats). These were later developed into the first widespread genome editing tool, CRISPR-Cas9.

Early life and education 
Mojica was born in Elche, Spain, on 5 October 1963. He attended Los Andes elementary school, Vázquez de Mella school, and Instituto Carrus high school. He enrolled first at the University of Murcia to study biology and later moved to the University of Valencia (BS, 1986) and University of Alicante (PhD, 1993). During his doctoral studies, he visited Paris-Sud University. He then received post-doctoral training at the University of Utah and the University of Oxford. Since 1994, Mojica has been a faculty member at the University of Alicante, were he has focused on molecular microbiology, which led to his discovery of the CRISPR system.

Career and research

The discovery of CRISPR
Mojica was the first researcher to characterize what is now called a CRISPR locus, reported in 1993. Part of the sequence was reported previously by Yoshizumi Ishino in 1987. Mojica described the complete gene sequence repeats in the archaeal organisms Haloferax and Haloarcula species, and studied their function. He continued research on these sequences throughout the 1990s, and in 2000, Mojica recognized that what had been reported as disparate repeat sequences actually shared a common set of features, now known to be the hallmarks of CRISPR sequences. He coined the term CRISPR through correspondence with Ruud Jansen of Utrecht University, proposing the acronym of Clustered Regularly Interspaced Short Palindromic Repeats to alleviate the confusion stemming from the numerous acronyms used to describe the sequences in scientific literature.

CRISPR as a microbial immune system
In 2003, Mojica wrote the first paper suggesting that CRISPR was an innate microbial immune system. The paper was rejected by a series of high-profile journals, including Nature, Proceedings of the National Academy of Sciences, Molecular Microbiology and Nucleic Acids Research, before finally being accepted by Journal of Molecular Evolution in February, 2005.

Awards and honors

Albany Medical Center Prize, 2017.
PLuS Alliance to Global Innovation, King's College London, 2017.
BBVA Foundation Frontiers of Knowledge Award in Biomedicine (shared with Emmanuelle Charpentier and Jennifer Doudna), 2017.

Honorary Degrees received
 Polytechnic University of Valencia, Spain, 2017.
 National University of Quilmes, Argentina, 2018.
 University of Valencia, Spain, 2018.
 Menéndez Pelayo International University, Spain, 2019.
 University of Murcia, Spain, 2019.

Publications 
(A selection from those mentioned in the institutional page of the Universidad de Alicante, and those referred by Lander in the article The Heroes of CRISPR)

References
Notes

Sources

External links

 

1963 births
Living people
Spanish microbiologists
Academic staff of the University of Alicante
People from Elche